McCowan is a Scottish surname. Notable people with the surname include:

Alexander McCowan, Canadian politician
Anthony McCowan, British barrister and judge
Bob McCowan, Australian rugby union player
Brenda McCowan, behaviorist
George McCowan, Canadian film and television director
John McCowan, British physicist
Teaira McCowan (born 1996), American basketball player